Rawlins Jackson "Rawly" Eastwick (born October 24, 1950), is an American former professional baseball relief pitcher, who played in Major League Baseball (MLB) for the Cincinnati Reds, St. Louis Cardinals, New York Yankees, Philadelphia Phillies, Kansas City Royals, and Chicago Cubs, from  to .

Career
Eastwick was born in Camden, New Jersey, and grew up in Haddonfield, New Jersey, where he attended Haddonfield Memorial High School. He was drafted by the Cincinnati Reds in the third round of the 1969 amateur draft. In 1973, he made it to the Indianapolis Indians of the American Association and made his major league debut in September 1974 with the Reds. He started back at Indianapolis in 1975 but pitched well and was called up for good. In his rookie season, he tied for the National League lead in saves with 22.

In the 1975 World Series against the Boston Red Sox, Eastwick won Games 2 and 3 and also earned a save in Game 5 as the Reds won the series in seven. In Game 6 he gave up a three-run home run to Bernie Carbo that tied the game, which the Red Sox won in twelve innings. In 1976, Eastwick had his best season, going 11–5 in relief with a 2.06 earned run average. He also led the league in saves and won the NL Fireman of the Year award. The Reds won their second consecutive World Series title.

Eastwick was dealt to the Cardinals for Doug Capilla at the trade deadline on June 15, 1977, as a result of a contract dispute with Reds management. His desire to become a free agent by not signing a contract with any team for the remainder of the season precluded him from being sent to the New York Mets in the Tom Seaver trade. Eastwick signed a five-year, $1.2 million deal with the Yankees at the Winter Meetings on December 9, 1977. He joined a bullpen which already had Sparky Lyle, Dick Tidrow and Goose Gossage who had signed for $2.7 million two weeks earlier. Eastwick's time with the Yankees lasted until the day before the trade deadline on June 14, 1978, when he was sent to the Philadelphia Phillies for Jay Johnstone and Bobby Brown. He spent two seasons with the Phillies, posting a 4.90 ERA in 1979 and was released. He then pitched for the Kansas City Royals in 1980 and the Chicago Cubs in 1981 before retiring.

See also
 List of Major League Baseball annual saves leaders

References

External links

Rawly Eastwick at SABR (Baseball BioProject)
Rawly Eastwick at Pura Pelota (Venezuelan Professional Baseball League)

1950 births
Living people
Baseball players from Camden, New Jersey
Chicago Cubs players
Cincinnati Reds players
Florida Instructional League Reds players
Gulf Coast Reds players
Haddonfield Memorial High School alumni
Indianapolis Indians players
Kansas City Royals players
Major League Baseball pitchers
National League saves champions
New York Yankees players
Omaha Royals players
People from Haddonfield, New Jersey
People from West Newbury, Massachusetts
Philadelphia Phillies players
Raleigh-Durham Triangles players
Sportspeople from the Delaware Valley
Sportspeople from Essex County, Massachusetts
St. Louis Cardinals players
Tampa Tarpons (1957–1987) players
Tigres de Aragua players
American expatriate baseball players in Venezuela
Trois-Rivières Aigles players